

63001–63100 

|-id=032
| 63032 Billschmitt ||  || William C. Schmitt, science educator, museum administrator, curriculum developer and university instructor || 
|-id=068
| 63068 Moraes ||  || Wenceslau de Moraes, Portuguese writer || 
|}

63101–63200 

|-id=129
| 63129 Courtemanche ||  || Michel Courtemanche (born 1964), an internationally known Canadian comedian and actor from Quebec. || 
|-id=145
| 63145 Choemuseon ||  || Choe Museon (1325–1395), a Korean chemist in the late Koryeo Dynasty who was the first to study gunpowder in Korea. Gunpowder manufacturing became a highly advanced technology, into which he put enormous effort. His research helped the nation bring about political and social change. || 
|-id=156
| 63156 Yicheon ||  || Yi Cheon (1376–1451) was a Korean polymath in charge of developing astronomical instruments. He also influenced metal printing, musical instruments and standardization of measurement systems. Great technological achievements in the Chosun Dynasty would be almost unthinkable without his contributions. || 
|-id=162
| 63162 Davidčapek ||  || David Čapek (born 1977), a Czech astronomer at the Astronomical Institute of the Czech Academy of Sciences. He performs theoretical work on non-gravitational effects on small solar system bodies and on the thermal stress and rotation of meteoroids. || 
|-id=163
| 63163 Jerusalem ||  || Jerusalem, the ancient Middle Eastern city. Its unique position among cities of the world derives from its crucial role in religious history as a holy city for three great monotheistic religions: Judaism, Christianity and Islam. || 
|}

63201–63300 

|-bgcolor=#f2f2f2
| colspan=4 align=center | 
|}

63301–63400 

|-id=305
| 63305 Bobkepple || 2001 FE || George Robert Kepple (Bob Kepple), American author of the Astro Cards observing aids and co-author of The Night Sky Observer's Guide || 
|-id=307
| 63307 Barbarawilson ||  || Barbara Wilson (1947–2019) was an accomplished visual astronomer, mentor, Texas Star Party speaker chairman, and the director of the George Observatory for many years. She was a virtual "who's who" in amateur astronomy with an infectious love of the night sky, and was cited in many astronomy presentations. || 
|-id=387
| 63387 Brazos Bend ||  || Brazos Bend State Park, Texas, is the home to the George Observatory , where this minor planet was discovered. The Park is located on 4975 acres in Fort Bend County. One of America's top ten state parks, it is rich in wildlife, including the American alligator. || 
|-id=389
| 63389 Noshiro ||  || Noshiro City is located in the northwestern part of Akita Prefecture, Japan. Since the establishment of Noshiro Rocket Testing Center, static-firing tests on various solid rocket motors used for space science have been carried out there. || 
|}

63401–63500 

|-id=440
| 63440 Rożek ||  || Agata Rożek (born 1986) is a research associate at the University of Kent (UK) and performs optical and radar observations of near-Earth asteroids to determine their shapes and spin states and to search for evidence of non-gravitational forces acting upon them. || 
|}

63501–63600 

|-id=528
| 63528 Kocherhans ||  || Joseph G. Kocherhans (born 1929) participated extensively in the recovery of Badlands Observatory, South Dakota, after a tragic fire in 1998. As part of this effort he designed, fabricated and donated an ingenious system to automate dome control. Prior to this, he had an extensive and noteworthy career in geological and civil engineering. || 
|}

63601–63700 

|-id=605
| 63605 Budperry ||  || Bud Perry (born 1936) is the president of the Oakley Foundation which provided major funding for the construction of the Oakley Observatory were this minor planet was discovered. || 
|-id=609
| 63609 Francoisecolas ||  || Francoise Colas (born 1958) is a French amateur astronomer who has taken part in numerous trans-Neptunian stellar occultation observations all over the world. She is also part of the observation team at the Pic du Midi 1-m telescope. || 
|}

63701–63800 

|-bgcolor=#f2f2f2
| colspan=4 align=center | 
|}

63801–63900 

|-id=897
| 63897 Ofunato ||  || Ofunato City is located on the south coast of Iwate Prefecture, Japan. Since the establishment of Sanriku Balloon Center in this city, a total of 413 heavy scientific balloons were launched until its closure in 2007. The center contributed greatly to the development of space science in Japan. || 
|}

63901–64000 

|-bgcolor=#f2f2f2
| colspan=4 align=center | 
|}

References 

063001-064000